Plavčići is an uninhabited village in the municipality of Zenica, Bosnia and Herzegovina.

Demographics 
According to the 2013 census, its population was nil, down from 8 in 1991.

References

Populated places in Zenica